David Destorme (born 30 August 1979) is a Belgian retired football player last playing for Waasland-Beveren.

Career 
On 10 June 2009, the 29-year-old attacking midfielder has left FCV Dender EH to sign a four-year deal with KV Mechelen.

References

External links
 David Destorme at Soccerway
 David Destorme at Footballdatabase

1979 births
Living people
Belgian footballers
F.C.V. Dender E.H. players
HSV Hoek players
K.V. Mechelen players
S.K. Beveren players
Belgian Pro League players
Challenger Pro League players
Footballers from Ghent
Association football midfielders